Chandrashekhar S Patil was a Member of the Legislative Assembly (India) who belonged to the Indian National Congress. Chandrashekhar Patil was born to Sangasetti Patil and Veeramma Patil in Mahagaon, Gulbarga on 25 January 1918. On 22 December 1960 he died in a motor vehicle accident. He was known for having participated in India's freedom struggle and the Liberation of Hyderabad Karnataka. Various books have been written on him including "Tiger of Hyderabad Karnataka Chandrashekhar Patil Mahagaon" which was published in 2019 and "ಪ್ರತಿಭಾವಂತ ಸಂಸದೀಯ ಪಟು ಪುಸ್ತಕ ಮೂಲಿಕೆ" which was published by the Government of Karnataka.

Chandrashekhar S Patil belonged to the first Karnataka Legislative Assembly. He was elected for a second term in the second Karnataka Legislative assembly for the Aland constituency in 1957 but died before he could complete this term.

References 

Indian National Congress politicians from Karnataka
1918 births
1960 deaths
People from Kalaburagi district
Mysore MLAs 1952–1957
Mysore MLAs 1957–1962